Badenoch is a traditional district of Scotland.

Badenoch may also refer to:

People 

 Alec Williams Badenoch (1903–1991), Scottish urologist
 Art Badenoch (1884–1972), American football player
 George Badenoch (1882–1915), Scottish football player
 Kemi Badenoch (born 1980), British politician
 Alexander Stewart, Earl of Buchan (1343–1405), known as the Wolf of Badenoch

Other uses 

 Badenoch & Clark, human resources provider
 Badenoch Group, geological formation
 Badenoch, Ontario, Canadian township
 Lord of Badenoch, Scottish title